Group A was one of two groups of the 2021 IIHF World Championship. The four best placed teams advanced to the playoff round.

Due to COVID-19 pandemic protocols, the tournament was held in a "bubble" behind closed doors with no spectators. Prior to the beginning of the tournament, and against objections by Prime Minister Krišjānis Kariņš and Minister of Health, Daniels Pavļuts, the Latvian parliament voted in favour of a notion ordering the government to develop a plan for allowing spectators who are either fully vaccinated or otherwise immune due to recent infection.

Standings

Matches
All times are local (UTC+3).

ROC vs Czech Republic

Belarus vs Slovakia

Denmark vs Sweden

Great Britain vs ROC

Czech Republic vs Switzerland

Great Britain vs Slovakia

Sweden vs Belarus

Denmark vs Switzerland

Slovakia vs ROC

Czech Republic vs Belarus

Great Britain vs Denmark

Switzerland vs Sweden

ROC vs Denmark

Belarus vs Great Britain

Switzerland vs Slovakia

Sweden vs Czech Republic

Sweden vs Great Britain

Denmark vs Belarus

Czech Republic vs Great Britain

Switzerland vs ROC

Slovakia vs Denmark

Belarus vs Switzerland

Sweden vs Slovakia

Czech Republic vs Denmark

ROC vs Sweden

Switzerland vs Great Britain

Slovakia vs Czech Republic

ROC vs Belarus

References

External links
Official website

A